Hayatgarh ( also spelled Hayat Garh) is a village situated near Kheewa in the district of Gujrat, Pakistan.

Villages in Gujrat District